Waisake Sotutu (born in Suva, on 11 November 1970) is a Fijian former rugby union player. He played as wing and as centre.

Career
At club level, Sotutu played for Wesley College, and then, for Marist. He later played the National Provincial Championship for Counties Manukau in 1989, and then, for Auckland between 1991 and 1997. Sotutu also took part at the first Super 12 season with the Auckland Blues. Later, he went to play in Japan for Yamaha Jubilo.

Sotutu's first cap for Fiji was during the test match against Canada, on 15 May 1999 in Vancouver. He would later be called for the 1999 Rugby World Cup roster, playing 4 matches at the tournament. His last test cap was against England in Twickenham, on 20 October 1999. Sotutu was also an All Black trialist in 1995 and played for a non-cap New Zealand XV in 1995.

After career
As of 2014, Sotutu was appointed as coach for Auckland Rugby sevens team.

Personal life
He is the father of the rugby union player Hoskins Sotutu and of the netball player Teuila Sotutu.

References

External links
 Waisake Sotutu international statistics at ESPN Scrum

1974 births
Fijian rugby union players
Living people
Rugby union wings
Rugby union centres
Fiji international rugby union players
I-Taukei Fijian people
Fijian rugby sevens players
Sportspeople from Suva
Blues (Super Rugby) players
Counties Manukau rugby union players
Auckland rugby union players